Psychonavigation 2 is a collaborative album by Bill Laswell and Pete Namlook, released on December 5, 1995 by FAX +49-69/450464.

Track listing

Personnel 
Adapted from the Psychonavigation 2 liner notes.
Musicians
Bill Laswell – electronics, producer
Pete Namlook – electronics, producer
Technical personnel
Anton Fier – recording
Thi-Linh Le – cover art
Robert Musso – recording

Release history

References

External links 
 Psychonavigation 2 at Bandcamp
 

1995 albums
Collaborative albums
Bill Laswell albums
Pete Namlook albums
FAX +49-69/450464 albums
Albums produced by Bill Laswell
Albums produced by Pete Namlook